This is a list of deities associated with blacksmiths and craftspeople.

African religions

Egyptian mythology
 Ptah, patron god of craftsmen and architects

Igbo
 Ikenga, Alusi of time, success, achievement, farming, blacksmiths, and industry

Yoruba
 Ogun, patron god of warriors, soldiers, blacksmiths, metal workers, and craftsmen

Asian religions

Arabian
 Qaynan, Sabean patron god of smiths

Hindu
 Ribhus
 Vishvakarman, architect of the gods

Japanese
 Kagu-tsuchi, patron god of blacksmiths, ceramic workers, and fire

Meitei
 Pisatao, god of architecture and crafts

Vietnam
 Bà Kim, goddess of metal and blacksmithing
 Tổ nghề Khổng Lồ, god of bronze casting

Ugaritic
 Kothar-wa-Khasis, patron god of metalworking

European religions

Celtic
 Brigid, goddess of spring, blacksmiths, fertility, healing, and poetry
Gobannus, Gallo-Roman deity whose name means 'the smith'
 Gofannon, Welsh god of blacksmithing, ale, architecture and building
 Goibniu, Irish god of blacksmithing, one of the Trí Dée Dána
 Lugh, god of craftsmen, games, arts, oaths, truth, and law

Circassian
 Tlepsh, god of fire, smithing, metal, weapons and virility

Finnish
 Ilmarinen, god of Blacksmithing and archetypal artificer.

Greek
 Athena, goddess of wisdom, handicraft, and warfare
 Hephaestus, god of metalworking and the forge

Hungarian
 Hadúr, god of metalworking and war

Nordic
 Thor, god of lightning, thunder, storms, sacred groves and trees, strength, the protection of mankind, hallowing, and fertility
 Brokkr, the one who works with metal fragments; blacksmith is a dwarf, and the brother of Eitri or Sindri.

Ossetian
 Kurdalægon, god of blacksmiths

Roman
 Vulcan, god of metalworking and the forge

Slavic
 Svarog, god of the forge, fire, the sun, and creation

See also
 List of fire gods

 
Smithing